John Rosenberg may refer to:
John Rosenberg (academic) (born 1953), Australian academic and information technology professional
John Rosenberg (American football), American football coach and graduate of Harvard University
John R. Rosenberg (born 1956), American academic
John M. Rosenberg (born 1931), Holocaust survivor and civil and human rights activist